Cotronei is a comune and town  in the province of Crotone, in Calabria, southern  Italy.
It is the home town of Giovanni Tallarico, grandfather of Aerosmith singer Steven Tyler.

The economy of Cotronei relies on the production of oil, wine, cereals, citruses, and the intense breeding of cattle.

References

External links
Official website

Cotronei